The 1993 season was the 88th season of competitive football in Norway.

Men's football

League season

Promotion and relegation

Tippeligaen

1. divisjon

Group A

Group B

2. divisjon

Norwegian Cup

Final

Women's football

League season

1. divisjon

Norwegian Women's Cup

Final
Trondheims-Ørn 3–2 Asker

UEFA competitions

UEFA Champions League

Preliminary round

|}

First round

|}

European Cup Winners' Cup

Qualifying round

|}

First round

|}

UEFA Cup

First round

|}

Second round

|}

National teams

Norway men's national football team

Results
Source:

Norway women's national football team

Results

References

External links
  Norge Menn Senior A, Football Association of Norway 1908–present
 RSSSF.no – National team 1993

 
Seasons in Norwegian football